Liu Songwei or Liu Song Wei (born 8 October 1989 in Shanghai) is a Chinese-born Hong Kong football player.

International career
As a Chinese citizen, he was eligible to play for the Hong Kong team after two years of residency.

On 1 June 2012, Liu Songwei made his international team debut in a friendly match against Singapore.

As of 16 October 2012

External sources
 Profile in HKFA.

1989 births
Living people
Chinese footballers
Hong Kong footballers
Footballers from Shanghai
Chinese expatriate footballers
Expatriate footballers in Hong Kong
Chinese expatriate sportspeople in Hong Kong
Hong Kong First Division League players
Hong Kong Premier League players
South China AA players
Fourway Athletics players
Hong Kong Rangers FC players
Hong Kong international footballers
Association football defenders